Ozaenini is a tribe of ground beetles in the family Carabidae. There are more than 20 genera and 230 described species in Ozaenini. They are found in North, Central, and South America. Most species inhabit tropical regions.

Genera
These 24 genera belong to the tribe Ozaenini:

 Anentmetus Andrewes, 1924
 Crepidozaena Deuve, 2001
 Dhanya Andrewes, 1919
 Entomoantyx Ball & McCleve, 1990
 Eustra Schmidt-Goebel, 1846
 Filicerozaena Deuve, 2001
 Gibbozaena Deuve, 2001
 Goniotropis G.R.Gray, 1831
 Inflatozaena Deuve, 2001
 Itamus Schmidt-Goebel, 1846
 Microzaena Fairmaire, 1901
 Mimozaena Deuve, 2001
 Mystropomus Chaudoir, 1848
 Ozaena Olivier, 1812
 Pachyteles Perty, 1830
 Physea Brullé, 1835
 Physeomorpha Ogueta, 1963
 Platycerozaena Bänninger, 1927
 Proozaena Deuve, 2001
 Pseudozaena Laporte, 1834
 Serratozaena Deuve, 2001
 Sphaerostylus Chaudoir, 1848
 Tachypeles Deuve, 2001
 Tropopsis Solier, 1849

References

Further reading

 

Paussinae